The Mercy of the Jungle (French: La Miséricorde de la Jungle) is a 2018 internationally co-produced film from Rwandan director Joël Karekezi. It tells the story of two Rwandan soldiers separated from their military unit at the beginning of the Second Congo War and their struggle to survive in a hostile jungle environment amidst intense armed conflict.

The film's festival debut was at the Toronto International Film Festival on 8 September 2018 and marks the second feature from Joël Karakezi. The film was selected among TIFF's Discovery series lineup; Stéphane Bak, one of the two leads, was selected as one of eight rising stars at the festival. The film appeared at the Festival International du Film Francophone de Namur in Belgium. On 20 November, it had its Rwandan premiere at the 2018 European Film Festival (EFF) in Kigali. The film won the Golden Stallion at FESPACO.

Plot
War-weary Sergeant Xavier (Marc Zinga) and fresh recruit Private Faustin (Bak) are accidentally separated from their Rwandan battalion inside Congolese territory when it is called out suddenly on nighttime raid. They face a lack of water, food, and threats from malarial fever and jungle wildlife. The two seek to reunite with the battalion by heading westward but must remain wary of interacting with the local population given Congolese antipathy to the Rwandan Army and the presence of irregular rebel factions.

At first the older Xavier is gruff and demanding toward the young private Faustin but a deep bond eventually develops between the two men, especially as Faustin makes critical contributions toward their survival. The film is interspersed with meditations on the horrors that have befallen the region and wider questions of meaning and mercy in times of war. Xavier is particularly haunted by the atrocities he has both witnessed and committed while Faustin is motivated by the murder of his family and a young wife he wishes to see again.

Eventually choosing to impersonate Congolese soldiers themselves, the two manage to fall in with a group of villagers who show them kindness and aid. The movie's various plot threads—pursuing rebels, reunification with the war, and the personal journeys of the two men—converge at the film's conclusion.

Cast
Marc Zinga as Sergeant Xavier
Stéphane Bak as Private Faustin
Ibrahim Ahmed as rebel leader Mukunzi
Kantarama Gahigiri as Kazungu
Abby Mukiibi Nkaaga as the Major
Michael Wawuyo as the Village Chief

Production
The Mercy of the Jungle was produced in Belgium by Aurélien Bodinaux through Neon Rouge Productions. Bodinaux, Karekezi, and Casey Schroen are credited with the screenplay. Tact Productions from France and Perfect Shot Films from Germany are listed as co-producers. Filming took place in Uganda.

Accolades

References

 

2018 films
Belgian war films
Films set in 1998
French war films
Rwandan drama films
Second Congo War
2010s war films
2010s French-language films
2010s French films